Mist Edvardsdóttir (born 17 October 1990) is an Icelandic footballer who plays as a defender for Valur in the Icelandic top-tier Úrvalsdeild kvenna. She was a member of the Icelandic national team, appearing in 13 matches from 2010 to 2015. Over her career she has battled and recovered from Hodgkin's lymphoma and three separate anterior cruciate ligament tears.

Club career
Mist started her career with Afturelding in the 1. deild kvenna at the age of 16 and later played two seasons for KR before signing with Valur in 2011. She played for Avaldsnes IL in 2013 and in October the same year, she signed with Brazilian club Vitória.

After her stint with Vitória, Mist returned to Valur in 2014. In June 2014, she was diagnosed with Hodgkin's lymphoma. Despite undergoing chemotherapy, Mist appeared in 15 of Valur's 18 matches during the season, missing one game due to being suspended after receiving a red card and the last two games after becoming too ill to play. By January 2015, the cancer was in remission and she played in all 18 matches during the 2018 season.

In January 2017, Mist tore her left ACL during practice and was expected to miss all of the upcoming season. In November 2017, Mist signed a three year contract extension with Valur. In March 2018, on her second full practice since the injury, she tore the same ACL again. She returned for the 2019 season and appeared in eight Úrvalsdeild matches before tearing her ACL once again, this time in her right knee. In 2020, Mist returned to the field with Valur. On 26 September 2020, she scored four goals in a 7–0 victory against third-placed Fylkir.

She had a standout season with Valur in 2021 and helped the team to the national championship.

On 21 September 2022, in a game against Slavia Prague, Mist suffered the fourth anterior cruciate ligament tear of her career, ending her season.

Titles
Icelandic Championships:
2019, 2021, 2022
Icelandic Cup:
2011, 2022
Icelandic Super Cup:
2010, 2011, 2022

References

External links
 

1990 births
Living people
Mist Edvardsdóttir
Avaldsnes IL players
Mist Edvardsdóttir
Mist Edvardsdóttir
KR women's football players
Toppserien players
Mist Edvardsdóttir
Mist Edvardsdóttir
Women's association football defenders
Associação Acadêmica e Desportiva Vitória das Tabocas players
Expatriate women's footballers in Brazil
Expatriate women's footballers in Norway
Icelandic expatriate sportspeople in Brazil
Icelandic expatriate sportspeople in Norway